Yangjiaping  is a station on Line 2 of Chongqing Rail Transit in Chongqing Municipality, China. It is located in Jiulongpo District. It opened in 2005.Line 18, which is currently under construction, will also serve the station in future.

Station structure

References

Jiulongpo District
Railway stations in Chongqing
Railway stations in China opened in 2005
Chongqing Rail Transit stations